Yakisoba-pan (焼きそばパン) is a popular Japanese food in which yakisoba is sandwiched between 
an oblong white bread roll resembling an American hotdog bun known as koppe-pan.
This high-carbohydrate food item is essentially a sandwich with a filling of fried wheat noodles.
Omura describes it succinctly as a "Japanese noodle bun."
Behymer more loosely terms it a "spaghetti sandwich" and it has also been portrayed as 
a Japanese stir-fried noodle sandwich.
Moreover, scenes of young people eating this high-carb food in Japanese films such as "Hanataba mitaina koi o shita"
[I fell in love like a bouquet] or "Shitsuren meshi" [Loveless] further attest to its cultural ubiquity in Japan.

History and variants

There are various theories about the origin of yakisoba-pan.
Most concur that it took off during the 1950s.
In that era the United States flooded Japanese markets with cheap flour products
and by 1955 it was appearing in department stores in Tokyo and soon nationwide.

Today yakisoba-pan is widely sold in convenience stores and bakeries, 
not only in Japan but also in some overseas locations,  
 as well as school canteens.

Numerous variations of this product exist in terms of seasonings, noodle thickness,
and noodle length. Some versions of yakisoba-pan come with red pickled ginger and mayonnaise.
Others feature a bit of parsley or lettuce. 
Since its ingredients tend to be cheap, this product is generally inexpensive.

See also 
List of Japanese dishes
List of sandwiches

References 

1950s in food
Japanese breads
Japanese noodle dishes